Yao Wenyuan (January 12, 1931 – December 23, 2005) was a Chinese literary critic, a politician, and a member of the Gang of Four during China's Cultural Revolution.

Biography
Yao Wenyuan was born in Zhuji, Zhejiang, to an intellectual family. His father, Yao Pengzi was a writer, translator and art critic.

He began his career in Shanghai as a literary critic, where he became known for his sharp attacks against colleagues, such as in June 1957 against the newspaper Wenhuibao. Since that time, he began to closely collaborate with leftist Shanghai politicians, including the head of the city's Propaganda Department, Zhang Chunqiao. His article "On the New Historical Beijing Opera 'Hai Rui Dismissed from Office, published in Wenhuibao on November 10, 1965, launched the Cultural Revolution.

The article was about a popular opera by Wu Han, who was deputy mayor of Beijing. Zhang Chunqiao and Jiang Qing feared the play could be counter-revolutionary because parallels could be drawn between the characters in the play and officials in the communist government. In the play, Hai Rui, a government official, speaks for the peasants against the imperial government, criticizing officials for hypocritically oppressing the masses while pretending to be virtuous men.  Hai Rui is dismissed because of this. Yao claimed it was a coded attack on Mao for dismissing in 1959 then-minister of defense Peng Dehuai, a critic of Mao's Great Leap Forward.

Confused by this unexpected attack, Beijing's party leadership tried to protect Wu Han, providing Mao the pretext for a full-scale "struggle" against them in the following year. Yao was soon promoted to the Cultural Revolution Group.

Yao Wenyuan was an ideal candidate for the criticism for such an opera because of his consistent socialist background. In April 1969 he joined the Politburo of the Central Committee of the Communist Party of China, working on official propaganda. A member of "Proletarian writers for purity" he was the editor of "Liberation Daily"  Shanghai's main newspaper. He joined the state's efforts to rid China's writers union of the famous writer Hu Feng.

On October 6, 1976, he was arrested for his participation in the Cultural Revolution and sentenced to 20 years imprisonment in 1981. He was released on October 5, 1996, and spent the remainder of his life writing a book and studying Chinese history. He lived in his hometown of Shanghai and became the last surviving member of the Gang of Four after Zhang Chunqiao died in April 2005. According to China's official Xinhua news agency, he died of diabetes on December 23, 2005, aged 74.

References

Publications 
Yao Wen-yuan: On the Social Basis Of The Lin Piao Antiparty Clique. Foreign Languages Press, Peking 1975.

External links 

 The Yao Wenyuan Archive at the Marxist Internet Archive.

Maoist theorists
Anti-revisionists
1931 births
2005 deaths
People from Zhuji
Deaths from diabetes
People of the Cultural Revolution
Gang of Four
Chinese propagandists
Heads of the Publicity Department of the Chinese Communist Party
Expelled members of the Chinese Communist Party
Chinese politicians convicted of crimes
Members of the 10th Politburo of the Chinese Communist Party
Members of the 9th Politburo of the Chinese Communist Party
Chinese Marxists
Politicians from Shaoxing
Writers from Shaoxing
Chinese Communist Party politicians from Zhejiang
People's Republic of China politicians from Zhejiang
Chinese Maoists